David "Dai" Smith (birth unknown – death unknown) was a Welsh professional rugby league footballer who played in the 1900s. Smith appeared on the losing side in three Challenge Cup finals; in the 1899–1900, 1901–02 and 1902–03 seasons.

Playing career

International honours
This was the first ever international rugby league match.

Challenge Cup Final appearances
Smith played  in Salford's 8-16 defeat by Swinton in the 1900 Challenge Cup Final during the 1899–1900 season at Fallowfield Stadium, Manchester, in front of a crowd of 17,864, and played  in the 0-25 defeat by Broughton Rangers in the 1902 Challenge Cup final, during the 1901–02 season at Athletic Grounds, Rochdale, in front of a crowd of 15,006, and played  the 0-7 defeat by Halifax in the 1903 Challenge Cup final, during the 1902–03 season at Headingley Rugby Stadium, Leeds, in front of a crowd of 32,507.

References

External links
Search for "Smith" at rugbyleagueproject.org

Other Nationalities rugby league team players
Rugby league fullbacks
Salford Red Devils players
Welsh rugby league players
Year of birth missing
Year of death missing
Place of birth missing
Place of death missing